Daniel Nguyen (born October 16, 1990) is an inactive tennis player. He is the first Vietnamese American to play in the US Open tennis tournament.  He has won a total of 15 singles and 5 doubles Futures titles and 2 doubles Challenger titles as of December 2019.

Daniel Nguyen is a graduate of Santa Barbara High School and the University of Southern California (USC). Nguyen was part of the USC team that won the NCAA Team Championship title four consecutive years.  Other accomplishments include winning the Boys 16s & 18s Doubles National Championships in Kalamazoo, being named the NCAA Tournament Most Outstanding Player in his sophomore year, and clinching the 2009–10 and 2010-11 NCAA Championships for USC.

In the 2009 US Open, he and former teammate JT Sundling were defeated 3–6, 6–2, 6–1 in the first-round of the men's doubles tournament by Máximo González and Juan Mónaco.  They qualified after winning the Boy's Junior National Tennis Championship Doubles Title in 2009.

Daniel Nguyen is playing for the Hai Dang - Tay Ninh team. He obtained Vietnamese citizenship on 28 October 2019 and plays under Vietnamese flag since then.
He won the silver medal in an all-Vietnamese men's singles final at the 30th SEA games in the Philippines in December 2019. His  compatriot Ly Hoang Nam in the final won the first ever tennis gold for Vietnam.

References

External links

 Daniel Nguyen vows to return to US Open
 Nguyen, Sundling push Argentinians at U.S. Open
 Player profile on USC
 Move to Santa Barbara works out for Nguyen
 Photo gallery of Daniel Nguyen

1990 births
American male tennis players
Living people
Sportspeople from Santa Barbara, California
Tennis players from Long Beach, California
USC Trojans men's tennis players
American sportspeople of Vietnamese descent
Competitors at the 2019 Southeast Asian Games
Southeast Asian Games medalists in tennis
Southeast Asian Games silver medalists for Vietnam
Vietnamese male tennis players
Southeast Asian Games bronze medalists for Vietnam